The Saarland national football team represented the Saar Protectorate in international football, and played 19 matches between 1950 and 1956. In total, 42 players appeared for the national team. With the exception of Kurt Clemens, who briefly played for Nancy, all players were members of clubs in Saarland. However, not all of players had personal or family roots in Saarland. Franz Immig had already played for Germany in 1939, while Karl Ringel, Gerhard Siedl and Heinz Vollmar did so in later years.

Key

Players

See also
Saarland national football B team
List of Germany international footballers
List of East Germany international footballers

References

External links
Match list from DFB 
All-time appearances at WorldFootball.net
Saar national team caps at EU-Football.info

 
Association football player non-biographical articles